Sam Werner (born December 3, 1995) is a former American soccer player who previously played for Sacramento Republic FC in the USL Championship.

Career

College 
Werner played four years of college soccer at Stanford University between 2014 and 2017, where he made 67 appearances, scoring 9 goals and tallying 9 assists. Werner missed the entirety of Stanford's 2014 season due to injury.

Professional 
Werner spent time on trial in Israel with Hapoel Hadera, making two appearances for the club in the Toto Cup.

On December 18, 2018, Werner signed with USL Championship side Sacramento Republic.

On October 20, 2020, Werner announced his retirement from professional soccer.

References

External links 
 
 Stanford bio

1995 births
Living people
American soccer players
Association football midfielders
Hapoel Hadera F.C. players
Sacramento Republic FC players
Soccer players from Montana
Sportspeople from Bozeman, Montana
Stanford Cardinal men's soccer players
USL Championship players
Expatriate footballers in Israel
American expatriate soccer players
American expatriate sportspeople in Israel